Jodie Foster is an American actress and filmmaker. Foster began her professional career as a child model at age three appearing in a Coppertone commercial. Following appearances in numerous advertisements, she made her acting debut at age 5, in 1968 with the television sitcom Mayberry R.F.D., following which she appeared in a string of television series including Gunsmoke, The Doris Day Show, Bonanza, and Kung Fu. Her film debut came with Disney's adventure film Napoleon and Samantha (1972). After receiving attention with roles in Tom Sawyer (1973), and Alice Doesn't Live Here Anymore (1974), Foster rose to international prominence in 1976 at age 13 with three prominent releases; Taxi Driver, Bugsy Malone, and The Little Girl Who Lives Down the Lane, with the first of these earning her a nomination for the Academy Award for Best Supporting Actress. She continued to garner praise and became a teen idol with starring roles in a array of films including;  Freaky Friday (1976), Candleshoe (1977), and Foxes (1980).

A child prodigy, Foster decided to take a sabbatical from acting at the height of her teenage stardom for four years to attend Yale University. Following her graduation, she made a series of smaller films before having her breakthrough with the courtroom drama The Accused (1988), for which she won the Academy Award for Best Actress. Her second Academy Award came for her portrayal of Clarice Starling in the psychological horror The Silence of the Lambs (1991). Other successful films in the 1990s were Sommersby (1993), Maverick (1994), Nell (1994), Contact (1997), and Anna and the King (1999). During this decade, she also made her directorial debut with the family dramas Little Man Tate (1991), and Home for the Holidays (1995).

During the 2000s, Foster appeared in Panic Room (2002), The Dangerous Lives of Altar Boys (2002), A Very Long Engagement (2004), Flightplan (2005), Inside Man (2006), The Brave One (2007), and Nim's Island (2008).

During the 2010s, Foster focused more on directing and made her acting appearances intermittent, starring in just three films; Carnage (2011), Elysium (2013), and Hotel Artemis (2018). Her directorial work during this decade includes the films; The Beaver (2011), Money Monster (2016), and episodes of the television shows Orange is the New Black, House of Cards, Black Mirror, and Tales from the Loop.

Acting credits

Film

Television

Filmmaker credits

See also
 List of awards and nominations received by Jodie Foster

External links
 
 
 
 
 
 

Actress filmographies
Director filmographies
American filmographies